Dr. Vaidyanathan Krishnamurthy (1929–2002) was an Indian veterinarian, conservationist and elephant expert known for his pioneering work in elephant care. He governed mudumalai theppakadu elephant camp and well known by the world as Dr.K or Elephant man or Elephant Doctor (யானை டாக்டர்)is the famous which he was called by. He has written the many journals related to the elephants and his last journal has been published in the London's Nature (journal). He is a member of International Union for the Conservation of Natural Resources and Asian Elephant Specialist Group. He is interested in the literature especially on Lord Byron poems.

Early life 

Dr.V.Krishnamurthy was born and brought up in the then Madras Presidency. He graduated from the Madras Veterinary College and started his career as a Field Veterinary Assistant Surgeon in 1952. Upon the creation of Andhra State in 1953, Krishnamurthy was transferred to Kambam, Madurai District where he served till 1957.

Activities 

Krishnamurthy is known for his activities in elephant conservation and suggested darts with chemical weapons as the safest and most efficient means of capturing wild elephants. He is credited with having raised living standards of captive elephants across Tamil Nadu. From 1953 to 1956 he performed post-mortem on 18 elephants, out of which 12 had been killed by poachers. He suggested the Tamil Nadu Government to introduce Temple Elephant rejuvenation camp which is now successfully followed. A considerable feat was the capture of the 'makhna' elephant which killed 15 persons in Tamil Nadu and Kerala.

Seminars and workshops 

Dr. V. Krishnamurthy has been on a short-time scholarship to the Smithsonian Institution, Washington, U.S. and conducted several workshops on captive elephant management. He had considerable expertise in hand rearing of orphaned elephant calves and was involved in the creation of a stud book record of captive Asian elephants. When Iain Douglas Hamilton, attended a seminar with Krishnamurthy at the Mudumalai sanctuary and found the jumbos crowding around in response to his voice, he remarked, "I would love to exchange places with you."

Retirement 

After retiring from Services, joined the Bombay Natural History Society (BNHS) as Project Officer and actively took up assignments on Radio Colaring of Wild elephants for study of their migration.  Actively involved in Asian Elephant Special Group (AESG) as a Steering Committee Member. Dr. Krishnamurthy was on a long list of committees for wildlife conservation. He was Senior Technical Consultant to the Asian Elephant Research and Conservation unit of the Centre for Ecological Studies at the Indian Institute of Science, Bangalore.

Awards 

The Government of Tamil Nadu made Dr. Krishnamurthy an honorary warden of the Nilgiri Hills. The Government of Kerala recognised his contributions with a certificate of merit in 1989. In 2000, Krishnamurthy was awarded the Venu Menon Allies Award for Animals Welfare.

Biography 

Tamil writer Jeyamohan has made Dr.Krishnamurthy as one of the title characters in his collection of short stories called "Aram" Stories on the title "Yaanai Doctor" (யானை டாக்டர்).

Notes 

1929 births
2002 deaths
Indian veterinarians
Elephant conservation
Wildlife conservation in India
Elephants in India